The Panther tank, officially Panzerkampfwagen V Panther (abbreviated PzKpfw V) with ordnance inventory designation: Sd.Kfz. 171, is a German medium tank of World War II. It was used on the Eastern and Western Fronts from mid-1943 to the end of the war in May 1945.

On 27 February 1944 it was redesignated to just PzKpfw Panther, as Hitler ordered that the Roman numeral "V" be deleted. In contemporary English-language reports it is sometimes referred to as the "Mark V".

The Panther was intended to counter the Soviet T-34 medium tank and to replace the Panzer III and Panzer IV. Nevertheless, it served alongside the Panzer IV and the heavier Tiger I until the end of the war. It had excellent firepower, protection and mobility, although its reliability was less impressive.

The Panther was a compromise. While having essentially the same Maybach V12 petrol (690 hp) engine as the Tiger I, it had better gun penetration, was lighter and faster, and could traverse rough terrain better than the Tiger I. The trade-off was weaker side armour, which made it vulnerable to flanking fire and a weaker high explosive shell. The Panther proved to be effective in open country and long-range engagements.

The Panther was far cheaper to produce than the Tiger I. Key elements of the Panther design, such as its armour, transmission, and final drive, were simplifications made to improve production rates and address raw material shortages. Despite this, the overall design has still been described by some as "overengineered". The Panther was rushed into combat at the Battle of Kursk in the summer of 1943 despite numerous unresolved technical problems, leading to high losses due to mechanical failure. Most design flaws were rectified by late 1943 and early 1944, though the bombing of production plants, increasing shortages of high-quality alloys for critical components, shortage of fuel and training space, and the declining quality of crews all impacted the tank's effectiveness.

Though officially classified as a medium tank, at 44.8 metric tons the Panther was closer in weight to contemporary foreign heavy tanks.  The Panther's weight caused logistical problems, such as an inability to cross certain bridges, otherwise the tank had a very high power-to-weight ratio which made it highly mobile.

The naming of Panther production variants did not, unlike most German tanks, follow alphabetical order: the initial variant, Panther "D" (Ausf. D), was followed by "A" and "G" variants.

Development and production

Design

The Panther was born out of a project started in 1938 to replace the Panzer III and Panzer IV tanks. The initial requirements of the VK 20 series called for a fully tracked vehicle weighing 20 tonnes and design proposals by Krupp, Daimler Benz and MAN ensued. These designs were abandoned and Krupp dropped out of the competition entirely as the requirements increased to a vehicle weighing 30 tonnes, a direct reaction to the encounters with the Soviet T-34 and KV-1 tanks and against the advice of Wa Prüf 6. The T-34 outclassed the existing models of the Panzer III and IV. At the insistence of General Heinz Guderian, a special tank commission was created to assess the T-34. Among the features of the Soviet tank considered most significant were the sloping armour, which gave much improved shot deflection and also increased the effective armour thickness against penetration, the wide track, which improved mobility over soft ground, and the  gun, which had good armour penetration and fired an effective high-explosive round. Daimler-Benz (DB), which designed the successful Panzer III and StuG III, and Maschinenfabrik Augsburg-Nürnberg AG (MAN) were given the task of designing a new 30- to 35-tonne tank, designated VK 30.02, by April 1942.

The "VK 30.02(DB)" design resembled the T-34 in its hull and turret and was also to be powered by a diesel engine. It was driven from the rear drive sprocket with the turret situated forward. The incorporation of a diesel engine promised increased operational range, reduced flammability and allowed for better use of petroleum reserves. Hitler himself considered a diesel engine imperative for the new tank. DB's proposal used an external leaf spring suspension, in contrast to the MAN proposal of twin torsion bars. Wa Prüf 6's opinion was that the leaf spring suspension was a disadvantage and that using torsion bars would allow greater internal hull width. It also opposed the rear drive because of the potential for track fouling. Daimler Benz still preferred the leaf springs over a torsion bar suspension as it resulted in a silhouette about  shorter and rendered complex shock absorbers unnecessary. The employment of a rear drive provided additional crew space and also allowed for a better slope on the front hull, which was considered important in preventing penetration by armour-piercing shells.

The MAN design embodied a more conventional configuration, with the transmission and drive sprocket in the front and a centrally mounted turret. It had a petrol engine and eight torsion-bar suspension axles per side. Because of the torsion bar suspension and the drive shaft running under the turret basket, the MAN Panther was higher and had a wider hull than the DB design. The Henschel company's design concepts for their Tiger I tank's suspension/drive components, using its characteristic Schachtellaufwerk format – large, overlapping, interleaved road wheels with a "slack-track" using no return rollers for the upper run of track, also features shared with almost all German military half-track designs since the late 1930s – were repeated with the MAN design for the Panther. These multiple large, rubber-rimmed steel wheels distributed ground pressure more evenly across the track. The MAN proposal also complemented Rheinmetall's already designed turret modified from that of the VK 45.01 (H), and used a virtually identical Maybach V12 engine to the Tiger I heavy tank's Maybach HL230 powerplant model.

The two designs were reviewed from January to March 1942. Reichsminister Fritz Todt, and later, his replacement Albert Speer, both recommended the DB design to Hitler because of its advantages over the initial MAN design. At the final submission, MAN refined its design, having learned from the DB proposal apparently through a leak by a former employee in the Wa Prüf 6, senior engineer Heinrich Ernst Kniepkamp and others.  On 5 March 1942, Albert Speer reported that Hitler considered the Daimler-Benz design to be superior to MAN's design. A review by a special commission appointed by Hitler in May 1942 selected the MAN design. Hitler approved this decision after reviewing it overnight. One of the principal reasons given for this decision was that the MAN design used an existing turret designed by Rheinmetall-Borsig, while the DB design would have required a brand new turret and engine to be designed and produced, delaying the commencement of production. This time-saving measure compromised the subsequent development of the design.

Albert Speer recounts in his autobiography Inside the Third Reich

Production
A mild steel prototype of the MAN design was produced by September 1942 and, after testing at Kummersdorf, was officially accepted. It was put into immediate production. The start of production was delayed, mainly because of a shortage of specialized machine tools needed for the machining of the hull. Finished tanks were produced in December and suffered from reliability problems as a result. The demand for this tank was so high that the manufacturing was soon expanded beyond MAN to include Daimler-Benz (Berlin-Marienfelde, former DMG plant), Maschinenfabrik Niedersachsen Hanover (MNH, a subsidiary of Eisenwerk Wülfel/Hanomag) and the Tiger I's original designer, Henschel & Sohn in Kassel.

The initial production target was 250 tanks per month at the MAN plant at Nuremberg. This was increased to 600 per month in January 1943. Despite determined efforts, this figure was never reached due to disruption by Allied bombing, and manufacturing and resource bottlenecks. Production in 1943 averaged 148 per month. In 1944, it averaged 315 a month (3,777 having been built that year), peaking with 380 in July and ending around the end of March 1945, with at least 6,000 built in total. Front-line combat strength peaked on 1 September 1944 at 2,304 tanks, but that same month a record number of 692 tanks were reported lost.

According to rough estimates the labour hours in comparison to the Panzer III stood at approximately 1 to 1.25, i.e. four Panther vehicles for every five Panzer III tanks built. Cost (without weaponry) PzKpfw
III RM 96,163; Panther RM 117,100.

The Allies directed bombing at the common chokepoint for both Panther and Tiger production: the Maybach engine plant. This was bombed the night of 27/28 April 1944 and production halted for five months. A second factory had already been planned, the Auto Union Siegmar plant (the former Wanderer car factory), and this came on line in May 1944. The targeting of Panther factories began with a bombing raid on the DB plant on 6 August 1944, and again on the night of 23/24 August. MAN was struck on 10 September, 3 October and 19 October 1944, and then again on 3 January and 20/21 February 1945. MNH was not attacked until 14 and 28 March 1945.

In addition to interfering with tank production goals, the bombing forced a steep drop in the production of spare parts, which as a percentage of tank production dropped from 25–30 percent in 1943 to 8 percent in late 1944. This compounded the problems with reliability and with the numbers of operational Panthers, as tanks in the field had to be cannibalized for parts.

Production figures

The Panther was the third most produced German armoured fighting vehicle, after the Sturmgeschütz III assault gun/tank destroyer at 9,408 units, and the Panzer IV tank at 8,298 units.

Cost
A Panther tank cost 117,100 Reichsmark (RM) to produce.
This compares with 82,500 RM for the StuG III, 96,163 RM for the Panzer III, 103,462 RM for the Panzer IV, and 250,800 RM for the Tiger I. These figures did not include the cost of the armament and radio. Using slave labour on the production lines greatly reduced costs, but also greatly increased the risk of sabotage. French-army studies in 1947 found that many Panthers had been sabotaged during production. The Germans increasingly strove for production methods that would allow higher production rates and lower cost. By comparison the total cost of the early production Tiger I in 1942–1943 has been stated to be as high as 800,000 RM.

The process of streamlining the production of German armoured fighting vehicles first began after Speer became a Reichsminister in early 1942, and steadily accelerated through to 1944; the production of the Panther tank coincided with this period of increased manufacturing-efficiency. At the beginning of the war, German armoured fighting vehicle manufacturers had employed labour-intensive and costly manufacturing methods unsuitable for the needs of mass production; even with streamlined production methods, Germany never approached the efficiency of Allied manufacturing during World War II.

Design characteristics

The weight of the production model was increased to 45 tonnes from the original plans for a 35 tonne tank. Hitler was briefed thoroughly on the comparison between the MAN and DB designs in the report by Guderian's tank commission. Armour protection appeared to be inadequate, while "the motor mounted on the rear appeared to him correct". He agreed that the "decisive factor was the possibility of quickly getting the tank into production". On 15 May 1942, Oberst Fichtner informed MAN that Hitler had decided in favour of the MAN Panther and ordered series production.

The Panther was rushed into combat before all of its teething problems had been corrected. Reliability was considerably improved over time, and the Panther proved to be a very effective fighting vehicle, but some design flaws, such as its weak final drive units, were never corrected.

The crew had five members: driver, radio operator (who also fired the bow machine gun), gunner, loader, and commander.

Engine

The first 250 Panthers were powered by a Maybach HL 210 P30 V-12 petrol engine, which delivered 650 metric hp at 3,000 rpm and had three simple air filters. Starting in May 1943, Panthers were built using the 700 metric horsepower (690 hp, 515 kW) at 3,000 rpm, 23.1 litre Maybach HL 230 P30 V-12 petrol engine. To save aluminium, the light alloy block used in the HL 210 was replaced by a cast iron block. Two multistage "cyclone" air filters were used to improve dust removal. Due to the use of low grade petrol, the engine power output was reduced.

The HL 230 P30 engine was a very compact tunnel crankcase design, and it kept the space between the cylinder walls to a minimum. The crankshaft was composed of seven "discs" or main journals, each with an outer race of roller bearings, and a crankshaft pin between each disc. To reduce the length of the engine by an inch or so, and reduce unbalanced rocking moment caused by a normal offset-Vee type engine, the two banks of 6 cylinders of the V-12 were not offset – the "big ends" of the connecting rods of each cylinder pair in the "V" where they mated with the crankpin were thus at the same spot with respect to the engine block's length rather than offset; this required a "fork and blade" matched pair of connecting rods for each transversely oriented pair of cylinders. Usually, "V"-form engines have their transversely paired cylinders' connecting rods' "big ends" simply placed side by side on the crankpin, with their transverse pairs of cylinders offset slightly to allow the connecting rod big ends to attach side by side while still being in the cylinder bore centreline. This compact arrangement with the connecting rods was the source of considerable problems initially. Blown head gaskets were another problem, which was corrected with improved seals in September 1943. Improved bearings were introduced in November 1943. An engine governor was also added in November 1943 that reduced the maximum engine speed to 2,500 rpm. An eighth crankshaft bearing was added beginning in January 1944 to reduce motor failures.

The engine compartment was designed to be watertight so that the Panther could ford water obstacles; however, this made the engine compartment poorly ventilated and prone to overheating. The fuel connectors in early Panthers were not insulated, leading to the leakage of fuel fumes into the engine compartment, which caused engine fires. Additional ventilation was added to draw off these gases, which only partly solved the problem of engine fires. Other measures taken to reduce this problem included improving the coolant circulation inside the motor and adding a reinforced membrane spring to the fuel pump. Despite the risks of fire, the fighting compartment was relatively safe due to a solid firewall that separated it from the engine compartment.

Engine reliability improved over time. The average service life expectancy without the need to dismount the engine from the tank was about 2000 km, or around 100 working hours.

Suspension

The suspension consisted of front drive sprockets, rear idlers and eight double-interleaved rubber-rimmed steel road wheels on each side – in the so-called Schachtellaufwerk design, suspended on a dual torsion bar suspension. The dual torsion bar system, designed by Professor Ernst Lehr, allowed for a wide travel stroke and rapid oscillations with high reliability, thus allowing for relatively high speed travel over undulating terrain. The extra space required for the bars running across the length of the bottom of the hull, below the turret basket, increased the overall height of the tank. When damaged by mines, the torsion bars often required a welding torch for removal.

The Panther's suspension was overengineered, and the Schachtellaufwerk interleaved road wheel system made replacing inner road wheels time-consuming (though it could operate with missing or broken wheels). The interleaved wheels also had a tendency to become clogged with mud, rocks and ice, and could freeze solid overnight in the harsh winter weather that followed the autumn rasputitsa mud season on the Eastern Front. Shell damage could cause the road wheels to jam together and become difficult to separate. Interleaved wheels had long been standard on all German half-tracks. The extra wheels did provide better flotation and stability, and also provided more armour protection for the thin hull sides than smaller wheels or non-interleaved wheel systems, but the complexity meant that no other country ever adopted this design for their tanks.

The Inspector General of Armoured Troops reported in May 1944:

In September 1944, and again in March/April 1945, MAN built a limited number of Panthers with overlapping, non-interleaved steel-rimmed 80 cm diameter roadwheels originally designed for Henschel's Tiger II and late series Tiger I Ausf. E tanks. These steel-rimmed roadwheels were introduced from chassis number 121052 due to raw material shortages.

From November 1944 through February 1945, a conversion process began to use sleeve bearings in the Panther tank, as there was a shortage of ball bearings. The sleeve bearings were primarily used in the running gear; plans were also made to convert the transmission to sleeve bearings, but were not carried out due to the ending of Panther production.

Steering and transmission

Steering was accomplished through a seven-speed AK 7-200 synchromesh gearbox from Zahnradfabrik Friedrichshafen (ZF), and a MAN single radius steering system, operated by steering levers. The driver was expected to judge the sharpness of a turn ahead of time and shift into the appropriate gear to turn the tank. The driver could also engage the brakes on one side to force a sharper turn. This was a much simplified design compared to the Tiger tanks.

The AK 7-200 transmission was capable of pivot turns but only when the ground resistance on both tracks was the same. This high-torque method of turning could cause failures of the final drive.

The overstressed transmission system led to premature stripping of the third gear. This was compounded by alloy shortages which made gears more brittle and prone to failure. To reach the final drive for repair, the entire driver's compartment and transmission had to be disassembled and lifted out.

The Panther's main weakness was its final drive unit. The problems stemmed from several factors. The original MAN proposal had called for the Panther to have an epicyclic gearing (planetary) system in the final drive, similar to that used in the Tiger I. Germany suffered from a shortage of gear-cutting machine tools and for mass-production numerous simplifications were made to the design and its manufacture, sometimes against the wishes of designers and army officers. Consequently, the final drive was changed to a double spur system; although simpler to produce, the double spur gears had higher loads, making them prone to failure.

Final drive
A report by Dr. Puschel of MAN said "The main cause of these failures was fatigue of the compound intermediate gear due to the low-core strength of the material used and the absence of case hardening at the critical sections." and "the use of split ring dowels                                   with only a few bolts to retain the main drive gear to its flange proved unsatisfactory. This difficulty was subsequently overcome by...fitting bolts."

German industry made a number of modifications to the final drive units on the Panther Ausf. G in September and October 1944 to increase the durability of the unit.
Jacques Littlefield, of the Military Vehicle Technology Foundation, which restored a Panther Ausf. A, said "we found that the alloy and gears used in their construction were as good as we could make them today. I suspect the main problem with the final drive was that they were designed for a much lighter version of the Panther...Once they started to up-armor the Panther, there was no room to beef up the final drives to handle the extra weight.

Armour
Initial production Panthers had a face-hardened glacis plate (the main front hull armour piece), but as armour-piercing capped rounds became the standard in all armies (thus defeating the benefits of face-hardening, which caused uncapped rounds to shatter), this requirement was deleted in March 1943. By August 1943, Panthers were being built only with a homogeneous steel glacis plate. The front hull had  of armour angled at 55 degrees from the vertical, welded but also interlocked with the side and bottom plates for strength. The combination of moderately thick and well-sloped armour meant that heavy Allied weapons, such as the Soviet 122 mm A-19, 100 mm BS-3 and US 90 mm M3 were needed to assure penetration of the upper glacis at normal combat ranges.

The armour for the side hull and superstructure (the side sponsons) was much thinner. The thinner side armour was necessary to reduce the weight, but it made the Panther vulnerable to hits from the side by all Allied tank and anti-tank guns. German tactical doctrine for the use of the Panther emphasized the importance of flank protection and German engineers tried to eradicate the issue by designing the Panther II. Zimmerit coating against magnetic mines started to be applied at the factory on late Ausf D models beginning in September 1943; an order for field units to apply Zimmerit to older versions of the Panther was issued in November 1943. In September 1944, orders to stop all application of Zimmerit were issued, based on false rumours that hits on the Zimmerit had caused vehicle fires.

Panther crews were aware of the weak side armour and made augmentations by hanging track links or spare roadwheels onto the turret and/or the hull sides.

As the war progressed, Germany was forced to reduce or eliminate critical alloying metals in the production of armour plate, such as nickel, tungsten and molybdenum; this resulted in lower impact resistance levels compared to earlier armour. In 1943, Allied bombers struck and severely damaged the Knaben mine in Norway, eliminating a key source of molybdenum; supplies from Finland and Japan were also cut off. The loss of molybdenum, and its replacement with other substitutes to maintain hardness, as well as a general loss of quality control, resulted in an increased brittleness in German armour plate, which developed a tendency to fracture when struck with a shell. Testing by U.S. Army officers in August 1944 in Isigny, France showed catastrophic cracking of the armour plate on two out of three Panthers examined.

Armament

The main gun was a Rheinmetall-Borsig 7.5 cm KwK 42 (L/70) with semi-automatic shell ejection and a supply of 79 rounds (82 on Ausf. G). The main gun used three different types of ammunition: APCBC-HE (Pzgr. 39/42), HE (Sprgr. 42) and APCR (Pzgr. 40/42), the last of which was usually in short supply. While it was of a calibre common on Allied tanks, the Panther's gun was the most powerful of World War II, due to the large propellant charge and the long barrel, which gave it a very high muzzle velocity and excellent armour-piercing qualities — among Allied tank guns of similar calibre, none had equivalent muzzle energy. Only the British Sherman Firefly conversion's Ordnance QF 17-pounder gun, of 3 inch (76.2mm) calibre, and a 55 calibre long (L/55) barrel, with its availability to fire APDS shot had more potential armour perforation power but was considerably less accurate owing to disturbances caused by the separation of shot and sabot and at a cost of less severe damage inside the target after perforation of the armour. The flat trajectory and accuracy of the full bore ammunition also made hitting targets much easier, since accuracy was less sensitive to errors in range estimation and increased the chance of hitting a moving target. The Panther's 75 mm gun had more penetrating power than the main gun of the Tiger I heavy tank, the 8.8 cm KwK 36 L/56, although the larger 88 mm projectile might inflict more damage if it did penetrate. The 75mm HE round was inferior to the 88mm HE round used for infantry support, but was on par with most other 75mm HE rounds used by other tanks and assault guns.

The tank typically had two MG 34 armoured fighting vehicle variant machine guns featuring an armoured barrel sleeve. An MG 34 machine gun was located co-axially with the main gun on the gun mantlet; an identical MG 34 was located on the glacis plate and fired by the radio operator. Initial Ausf. D and early Ausf. A models used a "letterbox" flap enclosing its underlying thin, vertical arrowslit-like aperture, through which the machine gun was fired. In later Ausf. A and all Ausf. G models (starting in late November-early December 1943), a ball mount in the glacis plate with a K.Z.F.2 machine gun sight was installed for the hull machine gun.

Initial Ausf. D were equipped with the Nebelwurfgerät with the later Ausf. A and Ausf. G receiving the Nahverteidigungswaffe.

Turret

Its transverse-cylindrical shape meant that it was more likely to deflect shells, but the lower section created a shot trap. If a non-penetrating hit bounced downwards off its lower section, it could penetrate the thin forward hull roof armour, and plunge down into the front hull compartment. Penetrations of this nature could have catastrophic results, since the compartment housed the driver and radio operator sitting along both sides of the massive gearbox and steering unit. Also, four magazines containing main gun ammunition were located between the driver/radio operator seats and the turret, directly underneath the gun mantlet when the turret was facing forward.

From September 1944, a slightly redesigned mantlet with a flattened and much thicker lower "chin" design started to be fitted to Panther Ausf G models, the chin being intended to prevent such deflections. Conversion to the "chin" design was gradual, and Panthers continued to be produced to the end of the war with the rounded gun mantlet.

The Ausf A model introduced a new cast armour commander's cupola, replacing the forged cupola. It featured a steel hoop to which a third MG 34 or either the coaxial or the bow machine gun could be mounted for use in the anti-aircraft role.

Powered turret traverse was provided by the variable speed Boehringer-Sturm L4 hydraulic motor, which was driven from the main engine by a secondary drive shaft, the same system as on the PzKpfw.VI Tiger. On early production versions of the Panther maximum turret traverse was limited to 6º/second, whilst on later versions a selectable high speed traverse gear was added. Thus the turret could be rotated 360 degrees at up to 6º/second in low gear independent of engine rpm (same as on early production versions), or up to 19º/second with the high speed setting and engine at 2000 rpm, and at over 36º/second at the maximum allowable engine speed of 3000 rpm. The direction and speed of traverse was controlled by the gunner through foot pedals, the speed of traverse corresponding to the level of depression the gunner applied to the foot pedal. This system allowed for very precise control of powered traverse, a light touch on the pedal resulting in a minimum traverse speed of 0.1 deg/sec (360 degrees in 60 min), unlike in most other tanks of the time (e.g. US M4 Sherman or Soviet T-34) this allowed for fine laying of the gun without the gunner needing to use his traverse handwheel.

Ammunition storage
Ammunition storage for the main gun was a weak point. All the ammunition for the main armament was stored in the hull, with a significant amount stored in the sponsons. In the Ausf D and A models, 18 rounds were stored next to the turret on each side, for a total of 36 rounds. In the Ausf G, which had deeper sponsons, 24 rounds were stored on each side of the turret, for a total of 48 rounds. In all models, four rounds were also stored in the left sponson between the driver and the turret. An additional 36 rounds were stored inside the hull of the Ausf D and A models – 27 in the forward hull compartment directly underneath the mantlet. In the Ausf G, the hull ammunition storage was reduced to 27 rounds total, with 18 rounds in the forward hull compartment. For all models, three rounds were kept under the turntable of the turret. The stowage of 52 rounds of ammunition in the side sponsons made this area the most vulnerable point on the Panther since penetration here usually led to catastrophic ammunition fires.

The loader was stationed in the right side of the turret. With the turret facing forward, he had access only to the right sponson and hull ammunition, and so these served as the main ready-ammunition bins.

Crew
The Panther had five crew members, the commander, gunner, loader, driver and radio operator. The commander, loader and gunner were in the turret, while the driver and radio operator were in the hull of the vehicle. The driver sat on the front-left side of the tank and next to him was the tank's machine gunner whose job it was to operate the radio.

Combat use
Panthers were supplied to form Panzer Abteilung 51 (Tank Battalion 51) on 9 January, and then Panzer Abteilung 52 on 6 February 1943.

The first production Panther tanks were plagued with mechanical problems. The engine was dangerously prone to overheating and suffered from connecting rod or bearing failures. Petrol leaks from the fuel pump or carburettor, as well as motor oil leaks from gaskets, produced fires in the engine compartment; which resulted in the total write-off of three Panthers due to fires. Transmission and final drive breakdowns were the most common and difficult to repair. A large list of other problems were detected in these early Panthers, and so from April through May 1943 all Panthers were shipped to Falkensee and Nürnberg for a major rebuilding program. This did not correct all of the problems, so a second program was started at Grafenwoehr and Erlangen in June 1943. Reliability improved with the Ausf. A and later G of the Panther, with availability rates going from an average of 37% by end of 1943 to an average of 54% in 1944. By mid-1944, the Panther was at its peak performance and widely regarded as the most formidable tank on the battlefield.

Eastern Front

The Panther tank was seen as a necessary component of Operation Citadel, and the attack was delayed several times because of their mechanical problems and to receive more Panthers, with the eventual start date of the battle only six days after the last Panthers had been delivered to the front. This resulted in major problems in Panther units during the Battle of Kursk, as tactical training at the unit level, coordination by radio, and driver training were all seriously deficient.

It was not until 23–29 June 1943 that a total of 200 rebuilt Panthers were finally issued to Panther Regiment von Lauchert, of the XLVIII Panzer Corps (4 Panzer Army). Two were immediately lost due to motor fires on disembarking from the trains. By 5 July, when the Battle of Kursk started, there were only 184 operational Panthers. Within two days, this had dropped to 40. On 17 July 1943, after Hitler had ordered a stop to the German offensive, Gen. Heinz Guderian sent in the following preliminary assessment of the Panthers:

During Zitadelle the Panthers claimed 267 destroyed tanks.

Another report about Panthers During Zitadelle:

A later report on 20 July 1943 showed 41 Panthers as operational, 85 as repairable, 16 severely damaged and needing repair in Germany, 56 burnt out because of enemy action, and two destroyed by motor fires.

Before the Germans ended their offensive at Kursk, the Soviets began their counteroffensive, and succeeded in pushing the Germans back into a steady retreat. Thus, a report on 11 August 1943 showed that the number of total write-offs in Panthers swelled to 156, with only nine operational. The German Army was forced into a fighting retreat, and increasingly lost Panthers in combat as well as from abandoning and destroying damaged vehicles.

The Panther demonstrated its capacity to destroy any Soviet armoured fighting vehicle from long distance during the Battle of Kursk, and had a very high overall kill ratio. It constituted less than seven percent of the estimated 2,400–2,700 total armoured fighting vehicles deployed by the Germans in this battle, and its effectiveness was limited by its mechanical problems and the in-depth layered defence system of the Soviets at Kursk. Its greatest historical role in the battle may have been a highly negative one—its contribution to the decisions to delay the original start of Operation Citadel for a total of two months, time which the Soviets used to build up an enormous concentration of minefields, anti-tank guns, trenches and artillery defences.

After the losses of the Battle of Kursk, the German Army went into a permanent state of retreat from the Red Army. The numbers of Panthers were slowly built up again on the Eastern Front, and the operational percentage increased as reliability improved. In March 1944 Guderian reported: "Almost all the bugs have been worked out", although many units continued to report significant mechanical problems, especially with the final drive. The greatly outnumbered Panthers came to be used as mobile reserves to fight off major attacks.

The highest total number of operational Panthers on the Eastern Front was achieved in September 1944, when some 522 were listed as operational out of a total of 728. Throughout the rest of the war Germany continued to keep the great majority of Panther forces on the Eastern Front, where the situation progressively worsened for them. The last recorded status, on 15 March 1945, listed 740 on the Eastern Front, of which 361 were operational. By this time the Red Army had entered East Prussia and was advancing through Poland.

In August 1944 Panthers were deployed during the Warsaw Uprising as mobile artillery and troop support. At least two of them were captured in the early days of the conflict and used in actions against the Germans, including the liberation of the Gęsiówka concentration camp on 5 August, when the soldiers of "Wacek" platoon used the captured Panther (named "Magda") to destroy the bunkers and watchtowers of the camp. Most of the Germans in the camp were killed; the insurgents had lost two people and liberated almost 350 people. After several days the captured tanks were immobilized due to the lack of fuel and batteries and were set ablaze to prevent them from being recaptured.

Eastern Front – Soviet service
In February 1945 during the Lower Silesian offensive operation, one captured ex-German "Panther" tank with an experienced crew from 4th Tank Corps under the command of the Hero of the Soviet Union Lt. N. I. Ageev was used in a reconnaissance mission. At dusk, the tank passed through the forest, attacked from the flank and destroyed three enemy "Panther" tanks, but then, during the retreat to Soviet positions, it was hit by enemy artillery and damaged. After the battle the tank was written off due to lack of spare parts and maintenance problems.

Western Front – France

At the time of the invasion of Normandy in June 1944, there were initially only two Panther-equipped Panzer regiments in the Western Front, with a total of 156 Panthers between them. From June through August 1944, an additional seven Panther regiments were sent into France, reaching a maximum strength of 432 in a status report dated 30 July 1944.

The majority of the German tank forces in Normandy – six and a half divisions – were drawn into fighting the Anglo-Canadian forces of the 21st Army Group around the town of Caen. The numerous operations undertaken to secure the town became collectively known as the Battle of Caen. While there were areas of heavy wooded bocage around Caen, most of the terrain was open fields which allowed the Panther to engage the attacking enemy armour at long range — its combination of superior armour and firepower allowed it to engage at distances from which the Shermans could not respond. Conversely, by the time of the Normandy Campaign, British divisional Anti-tank Regiments were well equipped with the excellent 17-pounder gun, and some US-supplied M10 tank destroyers had their 3-inch gun replaced with the 17pdr (giving the 17pdr SP Achilles), making it equally as perilous for Panthers to attack across these same fields. The British had begun converting regular M4 Shermans to carry the 17-pounder gun (nicknamed Firefly) prior to the D-Day landings. While limited numbers meant that during Normandy usually not more than one Sherman in each troop of four tanks was a Firefly variant, the lethality of the gun against German armour made them priority targets for German gunners.

In the meantime, U.S. forces, facing one and a half German panzer divisions, mainly the Panzer Lehr Division, struggled in the heavy, low-lying bocage terrain west of Caen. Like the Sherman, the Panther struggled in the bocage country of Normandy, and was vulnerable to side and close-in attacks in the built-up areas of cities and small towns. The commander of the Panzer Lehr Division, Gen. Fritz Bayerlein, reported on the difficulties experienced by the Panther tank in the fighting in Normandy:

Bayerlein still appreciated the Panther's virtues when used in the right conditions, writing "An ideal vehicle for tank battles and infantry support. The best tank in existence for its weight".

Through September and October, a series of new Panzerbrigades equipped with Panther tanks were sent into France to try to stop the Allied advance with counter-attacks. This culminated in a number of tank battles; firstly at Dompaire (12-14 September 1944) against the French 2nd Armoured Division where the newly formed 112 Panzer Brigade was decimated, which included the loss of 34 Panthers, and few losses for the French in return. Soon after that, the Battle of Arracourt (18–29 September) took place, and again mostly Panther-equipped German forces suffered heavy losses fighting against the 4th Armored Division of Patton's Third Army, which were still primarily equipped with 75 mm M4 Sherman tanks and yet again, came away from the battle with few losses. The Panther units were newly formed, poorly trained and tactically disorganized; most units ended up stumbling into ambushes against seasoned U.S. tank crews.

Western Front – Ardennes Offensive

A status report on 15 December 1944 listed an all-time high of 471 Panthers assigned to the Western Front, with 336 operational (71 percent). This was one day before the start of the Battle of the Bulge; 400 of the tanks assigned to the Western Front were in units sent into the offensive.

The Panther once again demonstrated its prowess in open country, where it could hit its targets at long range with near-impunity, and its vulnerability in the close-in fighting of the small towns of the Ardennes, where they suffered heavy losses. A status report on 15 January 1945 showed only 97 operational Panthers left in the units involved in the operation, out of 282 still in their possession. Total writeoffs were listed as 198.

The Operation Greif commando mission included five Panthers assigned to Panzerbrigade 150, disguised to look like M10 Tank Destroyers by welding on additional plates, applying US-style camouflage paint and markings. This was carried out as part of a larger operation that involved soldiers disguised as Americans to attack US troops from the rear. The disguised Panthers were detected and destroyed.

In February 1945, eight Panzer divisions with a total of 271 Panthers were transferred from the West to the Eastern Front. Only five Panther battalions remained in the west.

One of the top German Panther commanders was SS-Oberscharführer Ernst Barkmann of the 2nd SS-Panzer Regiment "Das Reich". By the end of the war, he had some 80 tank kills claimed.

Historian Steven Zaloga observed that the Panther's performance in the Ardennes operation against American M4 Shermans was disappointing for a vehicle of its technical specifications, given the Panther's superior armour and armament to the Sherman. Zaloga argues that this was down to the fact that at this point in the war, the quality of German tank crews had fallen and most Panther crews were inexperienced with minimal training. The lack of training exacerbated the Panther's technical weaknesses (poor power train durability and a lack of fuel and spare parts), resulting in many Panthers breaking down which were unable to be salvaged. Thus while a Panther was superior to a Sherman in the hands of an experienced crew, inadequate training, coupled with Sherman numerical superiority, resulted in a poor combat performance for the vehicle during the offensive.

Fortification

From 1943, Panther turrets were mounted in fixed fortifications; some were normal production models, but most were made specifically for the task, with additional roof armour to withstand artillery fire. Two types of turret emplacements were used; (Pantherturm III – Betonsockel — concrete base) and (Pantherturm I – Stahluntersatz — steel sub-base). They housed ammunition storage and fighting compartment along with crew quarters. A total of 182 of these were installed in the fortifications of the Atlantic Wall and Siegfried Line (Westwall), 48 in the Gothic Line and Hitler Line, 36 on the Eastern Front, and two for training and experimentation, for a total of 268 installations by March 1945. They proved to be costly to attack, and difficult to destroy.

Battalion organization
From September 1943, one Panzer battalion with 96 Panthers constituted the Panzer regiment of a 1943 organization Panzer-Division.

 Battalion Command (composed of Communication and Reconnaissance platoons)
 Communication Platoon – 3 × Befehlswagen Panther Sd.Kfz. 267/268
 Reconnaissance Platoon – 5 × Panther
 1st Company – 22 × Panther
 Company Command – 2 × Panther
 1st Platoon – 5 × Panther
 2nd Platoon – 5 × Panther
 3rd Platoon – 5 × Panther
 4th Platoon – 5 × Panther
 2nd Company – 22 × Panther (composed as 1st Company)
 3rd Company – 22 × Panther (composed as 1st Company)
 4th Company – 22 × Panther (composed as 1st Company)
 Service Platoon – 2 × Bergepanther Sd.Kfz. 179

From 3 August 1944, the new Panzer-Division 44 organisation called for a Panzer division to consist of one Panzer regiment with two Panzer battalions – one of 96 Panzer IVs and one of 96 Panthers. Actual strengths tended to differ, and became far lower after losses.

Reliability

The first Panthers saw combat at Kursk in summer 1943, revealing reliability issues beyond that typically expected for a new weapon system. This was improved through 1943; the Panther's operational rate went from 16 percent at the end of July 1943 to 37 percent by December 1943.

An improved version, the Panther Ausf. A, entered production in August 1943. This received improvements from the Panther Ausf. D, including a better turret with a new commander's cupola and increased turret traverse speed. More improvements began to have an effect on the combat-ready rate of the tanks deployed on the Eastern Front, which increased from 37 percent in February, to 50 percent in April, and 78 percent by the end of May 1944.

The Panther combat readiness in autumn/winter 1943 was low, because of engine problems. A contemporary report said "Until reaching the first preparation area, 50% of the vehicles were inoperative: 2/3 of them with engine breakdowns and 1/3 with and lateral transmission system.(Final drive)" 

After the measures taken by Maybach from the beginning of 1944 the reliability and service life of the HL 230 engine increased significantly, in practice equal that of the HL 120 engine.

Guderian wrote on 5 March 1944:

"The frontline reports said service life of the tank's engine had increased up from 700 to 1,000km [435 to 621 miles]. In addition, the same Panther tank-equipped unit reported that final drive breakdowns had ended and that transmission and steering gear failures were now within an acceptable range, which is damning with faint praise" 

Guderian commented on the reliability: "From 6 March to 15 April 1944, the 1.Abteilung/Panzerregiment 2 (1st Battalion, 2nd Panzer Regiment) reported a distance of between 1500 km to 1800 km. Four of their seven Panthers was still combat ready without any transmission or engine failure."

On 22 April 1944, the same battalion reported how a good driver and commander can improve reliability:

Der Generalinspekteur der Panzertruppen ( Inspector General of Armored Troops) acknowledged this in May 1944 "The average lifespan of a Panther can now be roughly equal to that of a Panzer IV with around 1,500 - 2,000 kilometers between two major repair and maintenance processes, but  
in several cases, at approximately 1500 km, the gear has broken down and the boxes have had to be replaced."

An example of Panther reliability appeared in the June 1944 edition of Nachrichtenblatt der Panzertruppen (Armoured Troops Bulletin), from a Panther-recovery tank driver's report:

On 28 June 1944, after the initial response to the Allied landings in Normandy, Guderian reported that: the Panzer IV, Panzer V Panther, and Panzer VI Tiger have proven to be successful. The Panther is inclined to catch fire quickly. The lifetime of the Panther's engines (1400 to 1500 km) is much higher than the Panther's final drives. A solution to the final drive teething is immediately needed

In September and October 1944, a number of modifications were fitted into the final drives as countermeasures to the reported problems including worn gear teeth, parts, bearings, and insufficient lubrication.

Allied response

Soviet
The Tiger I and Panther tanks were German responses to encountering the T-34 in 1941. Soviet firing tests against a captured Tiger in April 1943 showed that the T-34's 76 mm gun could not penetrate the front of the Tiger I; and could only penetrate the side at very close range. An existing Soviet 85 mm anti-aircraft gun, the D-5T, also proved disappointing. Several captured German Tiger I tanks were shipped to Chelyabinsk, where they were subjected to 85 mm fire from various angles. The 85 mm gun could not reliably penetrate the Tiger I except at ranges within the lethal envelope of the Tiger I's own 88 mm gun. The Soviets had already embarked on the 85 mm gun upgrade path before encountering the Panther tank at the Battle of Kursk.

After much development work, the first T-34-85 tanks entered combat in March 1944. Although the T-34-85 tank was not quite the equal of the Panther in the anti-tank role, it was much better than the 76.2 mm-armed versions and made up for it with proven reliability, more effective fragmentation shells, and production in greater quantities. New tank destroyers based on the T-34 hull, such as the SU-85 and SU-100, were also developed.

The Battle of Kursk convinced the Soviets of the need for even greater firepower. A Soviet analysis of the battle in August 1943 showed that a Corps artillery piece, the A-19 122 mm gun, had done well against the German armoured fighting vehicles in that battle, and so development work on the 122 mm equipped IS-2 began in late 1943. The early results of the IS-2's combat employment, which were confirmed by firing tests in Kubinka 1944, compelled the designers to seek innovative solutions.

The Panther carried more ammunition and had a faster firing cycle: for every 1–1.5 shots of the IS-2, the Panther and Tiger could fire 3-4 times. With the addition of a semi-automatic drop breech over the previously manual screw, this breech modification increased the IS-2's rate of fire to 3-4 rounds per minute.

The IS-2 proved to have surprisingly good anti-tank capabilities due to the D-25T's extremely heavy HE projectiles. Standard doctrine for purpose-built anti-tank guns of the period universally relied on small, dense solid projectiles propelled to high velocities, optimized for punching through armour. However, the 122mm HE shell would easily blow off the turret, drive sprocket and tread of the heaviest German tank even if it could not penetrate its armour.

The SU-152 self-propelled heavy howitzer was produced in large numbers throughout 1943, with the first SU-152s being issued to new heavy mechanized gun regiments raised in May 1943. It mounted a 152 mm gun-howitzer on the chassis of a KV-1S heavy tank.  Later production used an IS tank chassis and was re-designated ISU-152.  Because of its adopted role as an impromptu heavy tank destroyer, capable of knocking out the heaviest German armoured vehicles — Tiger and Panther tanks, and Elefant tank destroyers — it was nicknamed Zveroboy ("Beast Slayer"). As a self-propelled artillery piece, the SU-152 was generally issued with HE rounds rather than armour-piercing projectiles. The 152mm HE round produced a massive blast that did not rely on velocity for its effectiveness, making them effective against any German tank, including the Panther, Tiger and Elefant. It was renowned for its ability to rip the turret completely off a Panther/Tiger tank (at any range) by sheer blast effect alone, and numerous German AFVs were claimed as destroyed or damaged by SU-152 fire during the Battle of Kursk.

Early 1945, the SU-100 tank destroyer saw extensive service, when Soviet forces defeated the German Operation Frühlingserwachen offensive at Lake Balaton.

American and British

The Western Allies were aware of the Panther and had access to technical details through the Soviets, but there was a difference in the American and British camps as to the significance of the tank. After taking two years to catch up with German tank design in Africa, the British were wary of falling behind yet again. They had developed the excellent 17-pounder anti-tank gun, but did not yet have a vehicle in service that could fit this large gun into its turret. For its part, the U.S. Army did not believe that the Panther would be a significant problem, and did not foresee their armoured forces having to fight pitched engagements against large numbers of Panthers. The Panther was not seen in combat by the Western Allies until early 1944 at Anzio in Italy, where Panthers were employed in small numbers. Until just before D-Day (6 June 1944), the Panther was thought to be another heavy tank that would not be built in large numbers.

Shortly before D-Day, Allied intelligence reported that large numbers of Panthers were being used in the panzer divisions, and an attempt was made to investigate Panther production. Using a statistical analysis of the serial numbers on the road wheels on two captured tanks, U.S. intelligence estimated Panther production for February 1944 to be 270 units, much greater than what had been anticipated. This estimate was very accurate, especially compared to previous methods, as German records after the war showed production of Panthers for the month of February 1944 was 276. This indicated that the Panther would be encountered in much larger numbers than had previously been thought. In the planning for the Battle of Normandy, the U.S. Army expected to face a handful of German heavy tanks alongside large numbers of Panzer IVs. At this point, it was too late to prepare to face the Panther. As it turned out, 38% of the German tanks in Normandy were Panthers, whose frontal armour could not be penetrated by the 75 mm guns of the US M4 Sherman.

The British were more astute in their recognition of the danger posed by the increasing armour strength of German tanks. Work on a more powerful anti-tank gun had started in 1941, and the tanks to use it in 1942. When these programmes were delayed, a stop-gap solution was found. The 17-pdr could through modifications be fitted to a Sherman, and orders for this Sherman Firefly were placed in 1943. By the time of the Normandy invasion, 340 Sherman Fireflies were available to the Commonwealth armoured divisions. The British lobbied for American production lines to be modified to produce Fireflies, but these suggestions were declined by the U.S. Army, in part due to the poor performance of British tank designs in North Africa. There were also 200 interim Challenger tanks with the 17-pounder and other improved tank designs were under development. British and Commonwealth tank units in Normandy were initially equipped at the rate of one Firefly in a troop with three Shermans or Cromwells. This ratio increased until, by the end of the war, half of the British Shermans were Fireflies. The Comet with a gun similar to the 17-pounder had also replaced the 75 mm gun Sherman in some British units. The 17-pounder with APCBC shot was more or less equivalent in performance to the Panther's 75 mm gun, but superior with APDS shot.

At the time, U.S. armour doctrine was dominated by the head of Army Ground Forces, Gen. Lesley McNair. An artilleryman by trade, he believed that tanks should concentrate on infantry support and exploitation roles and avoid enemy tanks, leaving them to be dealt with by the tank destroyer force, which was a mix of towed anti-tank guns and lightly armoured fighting vehicles with open top turrets with 3-inch (76.2 mm) (M10 tank destroyer), 76 mm (M18 Hellcat) or later, 90 mm (M36 tank destroyer) guns. This doctrine led to a lack of urgency in the U.S. Army to upgrade the armour and firepower of the M4 Sherman tank, which had previously done well against the most common German tanks – Panzer IIIs and Panzer IVs – in Africa and Italy. As with the Soviets, the German adoption of thicker armour and the 7.5 cm KwK 40 in their standard armoured fighting vehicles prompted the U.S. Army to develop the more powerful 76 mm version of the M4 Sherman tank in April 1944. Development of a heavier tank, the M26 Pershing, was delayed mainly by McNair's insistence on "battle need" and emphasis on producing only reliable, well-tested weapons, a reflection of America's  supply line to Europe.

An AGF (Armored Ground Forces) policy statement of November 1943 concluded the following:

U.S. awareness of the inadequacies of their tanks grew only slowly. All U.S. M4 Shermans that landed in Normandy in June 1944 had the 75 mm gun. The 76 mm gun could also not penetrate the front hull armour of the Panther, but could penetrate the Panther turret mantlet at very close range. In August 1944, the HVAP (high velocity armour-piercing) 76 mm round was introduced to improve the performance of the 76 mm M4 Shermans. Tungsten production shortages meant that this round was always in short supply, with only a few available per tank, and some M4 Sherman units never received any.

Whereas Sherman tanks used a high flash powder, making it easier for German tankers to spot them, German tanks used a low flash powder, making it harder for Allied crews to spot them. Shermans, even though they were around 15 tons lighter than Panthers, had worse cross country mobility due to their narrower tracks. A US corporal stated:

The 90 mm M36 tank destroyer was introduced in September 1944; the 90 mm round also proved to have difficulty penetrating the Panther's glacis plate, and it was not until an HVAP version of the round was developed that it could effectively penetrate it from combat range. It was very effective against the Panther's front turret and side.

The high U.S. tank losses in the Battle of the Bulge against a force largely of Panther tanks brought about a clamour for better armour and firepower. At General Eisenhower's request, only 76 mm gun-armed M4 Shermans were shipped to Europe for the remainder of the war. Small numbers of the M26 Pershing were also rushed into combat in late February 1945. A dramatic newsreel film was recorded by a U.S. Signal Corps cameraman of an M26 stalking and then blowing up a Panther in the city of Cologne, after the Panther had knocked out two M4 Shermans.

The production of Panther tanks and other German tanks dropped off sharply after January 1945, and eight of the Panther regiments still on the Western Front were transferred to the Eastern Front in February 1945. The result was that, for the rest of the war during 1945, the greatest threats to the tanks of the Western Allies were no longer German tanks, but infantry anti-tank weapons, such as the Panzerschreck and Panzerfaust, infantry anti-tank guns, such as the ubiquitous 7.5 cm Pak 40, and tank destroyers, such as the Marder, StuG III, StuG IV, and Jagdpanzer. A German Army status report dated 15 March 1945 showed 117 Panthers left in the entire Western Front, of which only 49 were operational.

Further development

Panther II

The early impetus for upgrading the Panther came from the concern of Hitler and others that it lacked sufficient armour. Hitler had already insisted on an increase in its armour once, early in its design process in 1942. Discussions involving Hitler in January 1943 called for further increased armour; initially referred to as Panther 2 (it became the Panther II after April 1943). Production of the Panther 2 was slated to begin in September 1943.

On 10 February 1943, Dr. Wiebecke (chief design engineer for M.A.N.) suggested thoroughly redesigning the Panther II and incorporating Tiger components such as the steering gears, final drive, entire suspension and turret based on Eastern Front experience. Total weight would increase to more than 50 metric tons. Another meeting on 17 February 1943 focused on sharing and standardizing parts between the Tiger II tank and the Panther II, such as the transmission, all-steel eighty centimetre diameter roadwheels (only overlapping and not interleaved as the original Schachtellaufwerk roadwheel design used) and running gear. In March 1943, MAN indicated that the first prototype would be completed by August 1943. A number of engines were under consideration, among them the new Maybach HL 234 fuel-injected engine (900 hp operated by an 8-speed hydraulic transmission) and the BMW 003 aviation turbojet-derived, GT 101 turboshaft powerplant, planned to be of some 1,150 shaft horsepower output and weighing only some 450 kg (992 lb) without its transmission, only some 38% of the weight of the Panther's standard Maybach HL230 V-12 gasoline fueled piston engine.

Thus, plans to replace the original Panther design with the Panther II were already underway before the first Panther had even seen combat. But from May to June 1943, work on the Panther II ceased as the focus was shifted to expanding production of the original Panther tank. It is not clear if there was ever an official cancellation – this may have been because the Panther II upgrade pathway was originally started at Hitler's insistence. The direction that the design was headed would not have been consistent with Germany's need for a mass-produced tank, which was the goal of the Reich Ministry of Armament and War Production.

One Panther II chassis was completed and eventually captured by the U.S.; it was displayed at the Patton Museum in Fort Knox until 2010. It has since been moved to the National Armor and Cavalry Museum at Ft. Benning, GA. An Ausf G turret is mounted on this chassis.

Schmalturm turret
After the Panther II project died, a more limited upgrade of the Panther was planned, centred around a re-designed turret. The Ausf F variant was intended for production in April 1945, but the end of war ended these plans.

Another design drawing by Rheinmetall dated 1 March 1944 reduced the width of the turret front even further; this was the Turm-Panther (Schmale Blende) (Panther with narrow gun mantlet). Several experimental Schmaltürme (literally: "narrow turrets") were built in 1944 with modified versions of the production Panther's 7.5 cm KwK 42 L/70 standard gun, which were given the designation of KwK 44/1. A few were captured and shipped back to the U.S. and Britain. One badly damaged turret is on display at the Bovington Tank Museum. It had been used as a post-war range target until its historical significance was recognised.

This increased armour protection also had a slight weight saving due to the overall smaller size of the turret. The Schmalturm also addressed an inherent flaw with the earlier rounded mantlet in which incoming shots would ricochet off the lower half of the mantlet plate and go through the hull roof or into the turret ring.

The Panther Ausf F would have had the Schmalturm, with its better ballistic protection, and an extended front hull roof which was slightly thicker. The Ausf F's Schmalturm was to have a built-in stereoscopic rangefinder — using twin matching armoured blisters, one on each turret side, much like the Americans' post-war M47 Patton tank — and lower weight than the original turrets. A number of Ausf F hulls were built at Daimler-Benz and Ruhrstahl-Hattingen steelworks; there is no evidence that any completed Ausf F saw service before the end of the war.

E-50

The E series of experimental tanks — E-10, E-25, E-50, E-75, E-100 (the numbers designated their weight class) – was proposed to further streamline production with an even greater sharing of common parts and simplification of design. In this scheme, the Panther tank would have been replaced by the E-50. A Belleville washer-based, hull sidemount suspension system was proposed to replace the complex and costly dual torsion bar system. The Schmalturm would have been used, likely with a variant of the 8.8 cm L/71 gun.

Upgunning to the 8.8 cm 
During the development of the Schmalturm turret, Krupp proposed an up-gunned varriant using the 8.8 cm KwK 43 L/71 and modifying the turret minimally. Several drawings were made. Krupp's drawing Hln-130 shows that the gun was to be mounted 35 cm further forward than the 7.5 cm, with the gun carriage being 35 cm further back. This necessitated an extension to the turret. However, the gun still reduced internal space, making it harder to load. Krupp´s Hln-E142 drawing, called ´Pz.Kpfw. “Panther” mit 8.8cm L/71 (Kw.K.43)´, dating back to November 17, 1944, shows that the 8.8 would have had depression/elevation angles of -8/15 and would have lengthened the tank to 9.25 meters long.

On January 23, 1945, a meeting was held by the Entwicklungskommission in which the project was handed over to Daimler-Benz. The turret ring of the Daimler-Benz Panther-Schmalturm-8.8 cm was enlarged by 100 mm, which increased the weight by 1 tonne. For the most part, however, the design was an 8.8 cm Kw.K.43 L/71 with repositioned trunnions in a mostly unchanged Schmalturm turret. By March of 1945, Daimler-Benz was slated to produce a soft-steel prototype. At this time, Krupp returned to the project under a request from Colonel Crohn. They were given the task of developing a turret for the 8.8 cm, which was an adaption of their previous design. The design was approved on March 14, 1945, with production slated to begin in the last quarter of 1945.

Derived vehicles 

 Jagdpanther – heavy Jagdpanzer-style casemate-hulled tank destroyer with the 8.8 cm L/71
 Befehlspanzer Panther – command tank with additional radio equipment
 Beobachtungspanzer Panther – artillery observation tank; dummy gun; armed with only two MG 34
 Bergepanther – armoured recovery vehicle
 Flakpanzer Coelian – self-propelled anti-aircraft gun project, planned to be armed with twin Flak 43 37 mm AA guns in an armoured turret

Foreign and postwar use

Although a technologically sophisticated vehicle, the Panther's design had a very limited influence on postwar tank development. The French postwar AMX 50 tank prototype was indirectly influenced by it through the Entwicklung series, but never entered series production. According to Steven Zaloga, the Panther was arguably a forebear to the modern main battle tank.

The Panther itself also saw some limited use outside the German military, both before and after 1945.

During the war, the Red Army employed a number of captured Panthers. These were repainted with prominent Soviet emblems and tactical markings to avoid friendly fire incidents. Unlike captured Panzer IVs and StuGs, the Soviets generally only used Panthers and Tigers that had been captured intact and used them until they broke down, as they were too complex and difficult to transport for repair. Panzer IVs and StuGs, on the other hand, were so numerous in terms of spare parts and easy to repair that they could be used over a much longer period in combat conditions.

In July/August 1944, Hungary received at least 5 Panthers (Ausf A or Ausf G) which were used effectively in combat under the command of Hungarian tank ace Ervin Tarczay. They were received by the 2nd Company, 1st Battalion of the 3rd Armoured Regiment. A batch of 10-12 Panthers which were originally destined for Romania were given to Hungary in late 1944 because Romania switched sides. The Panthers took part in intense battles from early September 1944 to early 1945, fighting around the Carpathians, in the Battle of Torda and around Polgár, later making a fighting withdrawal north-west towards Budapest. The last surviving Panthers were reported to be lost in Slovakia by early 1945.

During March–April 1945, Bulgaria received 15 Panthers of various makes (D, A, and G variants) from captured and overhauled Soviet stocks; they only saw limited (training) service use. They were dug down, with automotive components removed, as pillboxes along the Bulgarian-Turkish border as early as the late 1940s. The final fate of these pillbox Panthers is unknown, but sources indicate that they were replaced and scrapped in the 1950s.

In May 1946, Romania received 13 Panther tanks from the USSR. They were initially used by the 1st Armoured Brigade, but in 1947 the equipment was ceded to the Soviet-organized "Tudor Vladimirescu Division", which was transformed from a volunteer infantry division into an armoured one. The Panther tank was officially known as T-V (T-5) in the army inventory. These tanks were in poor condition and remained in service until about 1950, by which time the Romanian Army had received T-34-85 tanks. All of the tanks were scrapped by 1954. The tanks were different models: Ausf A, Ausf D, and Ausf G. They were shown to the public in 1948, during the 1 May parade in Bucharest, painted with Romanian markings. Until 1950, the T-V (T-5) was the heaviest tank available to the Romanian Army.

During the Warsaw Uprising, the Polish Home Army captured and used two Panther tanks. One, nicknamed Magda, was used by Batalion Zośka's armored platoon under the command of Wacław Micuta to liberate the Gęsiówka concentration camp.

One captured vehicle (named "Cuckoo") also saw service with the British Coldstream Guards for some time.

Germany sold Japan a single Panther along with a Tiger in September 1943; by the time it was ready in 1944, it was impossible to ship due to Allied naval interdiction.

In 1946, Sweden sent a delegation to France to examine surviving specimens of German military vehicles. During their visit, the delegates found a few surviving Panthers and had one shipped to Sweden for further testing and evaluation, which continued until 1961. The tank is on display in the Deutsches Panzermuseum in Munster.

After the war, France was able to recover enough operable vehicles and components to equip the French Army's 503e Régiment de Chars de Combat with a force of 50 Panthers from 1944 to 1947, in the 501st and 503rd Tank Regiments. In 1947, the French War Ministry wrote an evaluation of them entitled Le Panther 1947. These remained in service until they were replaced by French-built ARL 44 heavy tanks.

The last 'production' Panthers were produced at the factory by German staff just after the end of World War II under the supervision of the Royal Electrical and Mechanical Engineers (REME) using available components. 9 Panthers and 12 Jagdpanthers were produced and shipped back to Britain for post-war trials. A complete Panther and a complete Jagdpanther produced this way are now at the Bovington Tank Museum, Dorset, with brass plates on them, explaining their history.

Gallery

Surviving vehicles
In working order.
 American Heritage Museum, Greater Boston, USA. Ausf. A
 Musée des Blindés, France. Ausf. A
 Deutsches Panzermuseum, Munster, Germany. Ausf. A Command Tank
 Wehrtechnische Studiensammlung, Koblenz, Germany. Ausf. G. Completed after the war in the Panther factory under supervision by UK REME engineers, used for tests
 Kubinka Tank Museum, Russia. Ausf.G
 The Australian Armour and Artillery Museum Australia. Ausf. A (Restored to working order in 2020, previously owned by the Rex & Rod Cadman Collection, UK)

More or less intact, but not in working order.

 Canadian War Museum. In January 2008 a partially restored Panther Ausf. A was put on display. It had been donated to the museum from CFB Borden, which acquired it following V-E celebrations in May 1945. It had spent two years in restoration prior to being put on public display.
 Panzermuseum Thun, Thun, Switzerland. Advertised as an Ausf. D/G hybrid, with a D hull and G turret. There are many questions surrounding this vehicle. The turret has a replacement sheet metal mantlet, vaguely resembling a late Ausf. G mantlet, with no ports for gunners sight or coaxial MG. The pistol port on the turret rear indicates an Ausf. A or early Ausf. G. The hull with the "letterbox" MG slot indicates an Ausf. D or early Ausf. A. The turret and hull numbers could help identify the correct model designation for the hybrid but neither of the numbers have been made public.
 The Wheatcroft Collection, private collector, UK. The collection has three Panthers, one being restored. Early Ausf. A (DEMAG production)
 Liberty Park, National War and Resistance Museum, Overloon, Netherlands  has an Ausf. G. This tank was abandoned by its crew after it was knocked out by a PIAT projectile, hitting two running wheels on the right side during the battle of Overloon. Its crew was killed when they abandoned the tank. The tank is exhibited in that same condition.
 Ausf. A (n° 201) – Royal Jordanian Tank Museum (Jordan)
 Sinsheim Auto & Technik Museum, Sinsheim, Germany. Ausf. A

 Musée des Blindés, Saumur, France. Ausf. A, Ausf. G
 Mourmelon-le-Grand, France. Ausf. A
 Bovington Tank Museum, UK. Ausf. G. Completed after the war in the Panther factory under supervision by UK REME engineers, used for tests.
 Grandmenil, Belgium. Ausf. G

 Houffalize in the Ardennes region of Belgium. A Panther Ausf. G can be found in the village. It fell into the river during the Battle of the Bulge and was later retrieved as a memorial.
 U.S. Army's National Armor & Cavalry Museum, Fort Benning, GA, USA, collection consists of the following 4 Panthers: Pz V Ausf. A; Pz V Ausf. G; Pz V Ausf. G with chin; & Panther II. Several of these were part of the Ordnance collection that was at Aberdeen, MD
 Private collector, Heikendorf, Germany - in July 2015 a virtually "intact" Panther Ausf. G was found in the basement of a private residence near Kiel. Along with other weapons, it was seized by the police and later transported away by the Bundeswehr. The future of the allegedly demilitarized (incapable of firing) tank is subject of the ongoing trial.
 Wilhelmina park, Breda, The Netherlands. The only known complete surviving Ausf. D. This tank was donated by the Polish 1st Armored Division after liberating Breda. It was restored in 2004–2005 for static display by Kevin Wheatcroft in exchange for its automotive components.
Wrecks.
 Sinsheim Auto & Technik Museum, Sinsheim, Germany. Ausf. A
 Overlord Museum, Colleville-sur-Mer (ex-Falaise August 1944 museum), France. Ausf. A. Will be cosmetically restored and displayed in the new museum in a diorama representing a field repair unit of the Wehrmacht, along with a Strabo Fries gantry.
 Kevin Wheatcroft, private collector, UK. Two Ausf. A, one to be restored and one to be restored to Ausf. D
 Celles, Houyet, Belgium. Ausf. G

Specifications

 Crew: 5 (driver, radio operator/bow machine gunner, gunner, loader, and commander).
Dimensions
 Length:  including gun,  hull only
 Width:  hull,  with skirt plates
 Height: 
 Combat weight: 
Performance
 Road speed:  at 3,000 rpm with HL 230 engine
 Road range: 

Obstacle crossing
 Vertical obstacle: 
 Trench crossing: 
 Fording: 
Suspension and tracks
 type: dual torsion-bar
 Shock absorbers: on 2nd and 7th swing arms on either side
 Track type: Kgs 64/660/150 dual centre guide
 Track width: 
 Ground contact length: 
 Track links: 86
 Ground pressure: 

Engine and transmission
 Maybach HL 230 P30 V-12, four-stroke internal combustion
 Displacement: 
 Compression ratio: 6.8:1
 Fuel: petrol, 74 octane
 Power:  at 3,000 rpm
 Fuel consumption:  on roads
 Fuel capacity: 
 Transmission: ZF AK 7-200 synchromesh manual coupled through Fichtel & Sachs LAG 3/70H clutch
 Gears: 7 forward, 1 reverse
 Steering: MAN single-radius clutch-brake
 Steering ratio: 1:1.5

Armament
 Main gun:  Kwk 42 L/70
 Turret traverse rate: 24°/second
 Elevation: +18°/-8°; (Ausf. F: +20°/-8°)
 Rounds carried: 79; (Ausf. G: 82)
 Primary gun sight: Leitz TZF 12; (Ausf. A and G: TZF 12a)
 Magnification: 2.5×/5×
 Field of view: 28°/14°
 Radio equipment
 Fu 5 transmitter/receiver
 Fu 2 receiver

Armour
All angles from horizontal.
 Hull front, lower:  at 35°; upper:  at 35°; (Ausf. G: lower Hull front reduced to )
 Hull side, lower:  at 90°; upper:  at 50°; (Ausf.
 Hull rear:  at 60°
 Turret front:  at 78°
 Turret side:  at 65°
 Turret rear:  at 65°
 Turret, top:  at 5°
 Gun mantlet:  rounded

See also 

 German tank problem
 Panther II tank
 German tanks in World War II
 List of armoured fighting vehicles of World War II
 List of WWII Maybach engines

Tanks of comparable role, performance and era
 Hungarian 44M Tas
 Soviet T-34-85 and T-44
 United States M4A3E8 "Easy Eight" and M26 Pershing
 British Comet and Centurion Mk. 1
 Japanese Type 4 Chi-To and Type 5 Chi-Ri

References

Notes

Citations

Bibliography

External links

 Panthers survivors – A PDF file presenting the Panther tanks
 Panther in Kubinka tank museum, in the work condition
 Tank duel at the cologne cathedral Pershing vs. Panther
 "How to kill a Panther Tank" Military History Visualised

Medium tanks of Germany
World War II medium tanks
World War II tanks of Germany
Military vehicles introduced from 1940 to 1944